An election for the one elected seat on the Legislative Council was held in the Gambia in 1947. It was the first time that the Council had had a directly elected representative.

Background
In 1946 the Legislative Council was reorganised and increased in size from 11 to 14 members. It would consist of three ex-officio members, three officials, six appointees and one elected member.

Results
The seat was won by Edward Francis Small, the founder of the Gambia Labour Union, who defeated Ibrahima Garba-Jahumpa (who later founded the Muslim Congress Party) and Sheikh Omar Fye.

References

Gambia
Parliamentary elections in the Gambia
1947 in the Gambia
Gambia Colony and Protectorate
Election and referendum articles with incomplete results